Al-sira al-nabawiyya is the genre of traditional biographies of Muhammad.

Al-Sira al-Nabawiyya may also refer to:

Al-Sirah al-Nabawiyyah (Ibn Hisham)
Al-Sira al-Nabawiyya (Ibn Kathir)
Al-Sirah al-Nabawiyyah (Ibn Ishaq)
Siyer-i Nebi by Mustafa ibn Yusuf al-Darir